Urmankul (Urmankül) is a rural locality (a village) in Kazanchinsky Selsoviet, Askinsky District, Bashkortostan, Russia. The population was 147 as of 2010. There are 3 streets.

Geography 
Urmankul is located 36 km northwest of Askino (the district's administrative centre) by road. Starye Kazanchi is the nearest rural locality.

References 

Rural localities in Askinsky District